Saint-Georges-d'Annebecq is a commune in the Orne department in Normandy (north-western France).

See also
Communes of the Orne department

References

Saintgeorgesdannebecq